Fusobacteriota are obligately anaerobic non-sporeforming Gram-negative bacilli. Since the first reports in the late nineteenth century, various names have been applied to these organisms, sometimes with the same name being applied to different species. More recently, not only have there been changes to the nomenclature, but also attempts to differentiate between species which are believed to be either pathogenic or commensal or both. Because of their asaccharolytic nature, and a general paucity of positive results in routine biochemical tests, laboratory identification of the Fusobacteriota has been difficult. However, the application of novel molecular biological techniques to taxonomy has established a number of new species, together with the subspeciation of Fusobacterium necrophorum and F. nucleatum, and provided new methods for identification. The involvement of Fusobacteriota in a wide spectrum of human infections causing tissue necrosis and septicaemia has long been recognised, and, more recently, their importance in intra-amniotic infections, premature labour and tropical ulcers has been reported.

Since the first reports of Fusobacteriota in the late nineteenth century, the variety of species names has led to some confusion within the genera Fusobacterium and Leptotrichia. However, newer methods of investigation have led to a better understanding of the taxonomy, with the description of several new species of Fusobacteriota. Among the new species described are F. ulcerans from tropical ulcers, and several species from the oral cavity. Subspeciation of the important species F. necrophorum and F. nucleatum has also been possible. It is probable that the taxonomy of the Fusobacteriota may be further developed in the future.

Phylogeny
The currently accepted taxonomy is based on the List of Prokaryotic names with Standing in Nomenclature (LSPN) and National Center for Biotechnology Information (NCBI).

Role in Human Disease 
New evidence is emerging that this bacterium may cause or be related to human colon cancer. In 2011 investigators reported the presence of Fusobacteriota in colon cancer tissue (Genome Res 2012; 22:292) and a new multicenter study provides evidence that some cases-particularly right-sided might be caused by infection by Fusobacteriota.

See also 
 Fusiform
 List of bacteria genera
 List of bacterial orders

References 

 
Gut flora bacteria
Bacteria phyla
Monotypic bacteria taxa